Fred Andrews (15 September 1864 – 2 June 1929) was a Welsh international rugby union forward who played club rugby for Swansea Rugby Football Club.

Andrews gained his first international cap, when he was selected to play for Charlie Newman's Wales, against England on 5 January 1884. This was the first rugby international to be played in Yorkshire with the game held at Cardigan Field in Leeds. Although Wales lost the match, it was a landmark game with Wales scoring their first try against England. Andrews was selected for the next match in the 1884 Home Nations Championship, seven days later, this time facing Scotland. Wales lost again, though both Scottish tries were heavily disputed. Andrews was never reselected to represent Wales.

International matches played
Wales
 1884
 1884

Bibliography

References 

1864 births
1929 deaths
People educated at Cheltenham College
Rugby union forwards
Rugby union players from Swansea
Swansea RFC players
Wales international rugby union players